Microxeromagna is a genus of small, air-breathing land snails, terrestrial pulmonate gastropod mollusks in the subfamily Helicellinae of the family Geomitridae. 

The genus is distributed along the Mediterranean basin, from the Italian Peninsula to Middle east.

Species 
The genus Microxeromagna is monospecific:
 Microxeromagna lowei (Potiez & Michaud, 1838)
Synonyms
 Microxeromagna armillata (R. T. Lowe, 1852): synonym of Microxeromagna lowei (Potiez & Michaud, 1838) (junior synonym)

References 

Gastropod genera
Geomitridae